Termites of 1938 is a 1938 short subject directed by Del Lord starring American slapstick comedy team The Three Stooges (Moe Howard, Larry Fine and Curly Howard). It is the 28th entry in the series released by Columbia Pictures starring the comedians, who released 190 shorts for the studio between 1934 and 1959.

Plot
A high-society woman named Muriel (Bess Flowers) wants to attend a swanky dinner party thrown by a friend of hers, but her husband, Arthur, decides instead to go on a fishing trip.  Rather than showing up stag to the party, Muriel tells her housekeeper to call the Acme Escort Service to bring a few "college boy" escorts. However, the housekeeper accidentally calls the Acme Exterminator Co., run by the Stooges. The phone rings as the Stooges are testing unorthodox techniques for catching a mouse, including Curly playing a piccolo and Moe using a cannon; a mouse sets off the cannon and causing Moe to be shot into a wall. Moe, his ears still ringing from the cannon, answers and, unwittingly, the boys are hired to be Muriel's escorts to the party.

At the mansion, the guests all arrive, and not long afterwards the Stooges show up in tuxedos in a dilapidated automobile. The Stooges, convinced that they were hired to clear the house of pests, are about to get to work when they hear that dinner is served. Moe tells his pals that they "always feed ya at these high class joints", and the Stooges rush to the dining room to eat. The Stooges astonish the guests with their lack of proper dinner etiquette.

After dinner, the guests enter the main hall where a small group of musicians are playing. The Stooges then take over and begin to perform while actually syncing to music playing from a nearby Victrola. The Stooges continue their mock performance until Moe accidentally grabs a saw and cuts the bass in half. Several mice inside begin to scurry about, causing the guests to run away, and the boys decide then and there to get to work. The boys make a shambles of the house.

Larry and Curly drill holes into the wall and spray for termites, not realizing they are actually drilling into the next room. After having no luck finding termites, Larry and Curly try one more time, only to accidentally hit Muriel with the tip of the drill. She screams and jumps, causing her to break through the stairs. It is at this point that Arthur, the owner of the house, arrives home to find Muriel stuck halfway out of the stairs. He finds the Stooges, and chases them out of the mansion, wielding a Gopher Bomb. The boys run to their car and make an escape, but Arthur throws the bomb into the car, causing it to explode and scatter the Stooges all over the street.

Production notes
Termites of 1938 was filmed on October 19–23, 1937. The film's title is a parody of the film title Gold Diggers of 1937. The film has two musical quirks unusual for Stooge shorts. First, the Three Stooges' opening theme, "Listen to the Mockingbird," is played again when the Stooges first appear onscreen. Second, music derived from Victor Schertzinger's score for the 1933 Columbia feature Cocktail Hour is featured during the dinner scene. This is the result of producer Charley Chase, who liked incidental music from his time at the Hal Roach studio.

Termites of 1938 was remade in 1946 as Society Mugs, starring future Stooge Shemp Howard and Tom Kennedy.

References

External links
 
 

1938 films
1938 comedy films
American black-and-white films
Films directed by Del Lord
The Three Stooges films
Columbia Pictures short films
American comedy films
1930s English-language films
1930s American films